Kohl Island is a small island of the Near Islands, an archipelago in the extreme west of the Aleutian Islands of Alaska. It lies on the south side of Agattu Island.

References

Uninhabited islands of Alaska
Islands of Unorganized Borough, Alaska
Islands of Alaska